Dhanaw English is a village situated in the Rohtas district, Bihar India.
There is a small city near this village called Nashriganj where peoples of that village do their marketing.
This village has a small history behind the name it called "English" because when we ask our grandparents they use to say that [Because English men stayed there it was named Dhanaw English.

It has a beautiful ground situated in the middle of the village where the primary school has been situated. This ground has a history of football matches which were played by elders. This ground is famous for its length and wider pitch. This only the ground which is left for matches – especially football matches. Still, football matches are organised by Sraswati Club Nashriganj Dhanaw.

Villages in Rohtas district